The 1953 Davis Cup was the 42nd edition of the Davis Cup, the most important tournament between national teams in men's tennis. 24 teams entered the Europe Zone, 6 teams entered the America Zone, and India was the sole competitor in the Eastern Zone. This year saw the first appearances in the competition of both Ceylon and a team representing the West Indies. For the first time play took place on the African continent, when the first-round Europe Zone tie between Egypt and Austria was held in Cairo.

The United States defeated Canada in the America Zone final, and Belgium defeated Denmark in the Europe Zone final. In the Inter-Zonal Zone, Belgium defeated India in the semifinal, and then lost to the United States in the final. In the Challenge Round the United States were defeated by the defending champions Australia. The final was played at Kooyong Stadium in Melbourne, Australia on 28–31 December.

America Zone

Draw

Final
Canada vs. United States

Europe Zone

Draw

Final
Denmark vs. Belgium

Inter-Zonal Zone

Draw

Semifinals
Belgium vs. India

Final
United States vs. Belgium

Challenge Round
Australia vs. United States

References

External links
Davis Cup official website

 
Davis Cups by year
Davis Cup
Davis Cup
Davis Cup
Davis Cup